Ivan Ljubičić defeated Andy Murray 6–4, 6–4 to win the 2007 Qatar Open singles event.

Seeds

Draw

Finals

Section 1

Section 2

External links
Singles Draw
Qualifying Draw

2007 Qatar Open
2007 ATP Tour
Qatar Open (tennis)